A Single Shot is a 2013 American crime thriller film directed by David M. Rosenthal and written by Matthew F. Jones, based on his own novel of the same name. It stars Sam Rockwell, William H. Macy, Ted Levine, Kelly Reilly and Jason Isaacs.

Plot
John Moon's wife recently took their son and left. Before John's father died, he was unable to pay the mortgage on the farm, and it was sold. John is depressed and an emotional wreck. He lives in poverty in rural West Virginia, feeding himself by hunting deer. While illegally stalking a deer with a shotgun on Nature Conservancy land, he accidentally shoots and kills a young woman. He then finds a box containing $100,000 in the abandoned van where she was hiding. He hides the woman's body in a shipping container.

During the following days, he attempts to reconcile with his wife. He contacts a local attorney to try to negotiate for his wife and son's return home and leaves the attorney several hundred dollars, drawing the attorneys' attention. John visits his son at his wife's apartment and interrupts the babysitter having sex with a recently released convict who has returned home. As he leaves he is threatened by a stranger who resents his glance.

John returns to his trailer and finds that someone has trashed it, apparently looking for the money. The dead girl's body is on his bed with a note. His wife shows up and wants to come inside and get her clothing, but John refuses. John visits the attorney and threatens him with a pistol, trying to force him to reveal what he knows. All he learns is that his wife was concerned about where John got the money and wants to talk to him.
Later, while he is in his trailer, someone shoots and kills his dog. In another incident a rock wrapped in a note threatening his family is thrown through the trailer window. John suspects the ex-con is responsible for these events. He enters the ex-con's motel room and is interrupted by the ex-con's return. He hides in the louvered closet. The stranger from outside the diner arrives at the hotel room and asks the ex-con if he's "gotten the money back".  The ex-con tells him that the woman who had the money has died and the stranger is furious. John sees him slit the ex-con's throat. The ex-con falls into the closet and sees John, but is unable to talk before he dies. John manages to avoid detection and goes home. 

A friendly local girl brings John something to eat, and while they are eating outside, the radio in the trailer starts playing loudly. John goes inside to investigate, carrying a pistol. He hears the girl scream outside, and returns to find her held captive by the stranger. John is forced to discard his pistol and knife. The stranger asks John where the money is. John says he buried it nearby. The stranger tells him to go get it, but first cuts off John's right index finger and thumb, to be sure he can't use a weapon. John goes to his truck and gets a scoped rifle. Despite his wounds, he successfully kills the stranger. He takes the girl to town and returns to the trailer and a shed outside, which contains a freezer in which he has hidden the dead woman's body. He drags her body up the hill and digs a hole to bury her. Weakened by loss of blood, he's unable to get out of the hole. He pulls the girl′s body into the hole with him and looks up to see a deer looking down at him from the edge of the hole.

Cast
 Sam Rockwell as John Moon
 Jeffrey Wright as Simon
 Kelly Reilly as Jess
 Jason Isaacs as Waylon
 Joe Anderson as Obadiah
 Ophelia Lovibond as Abbie
 Ted Levine as Cecile
 William H. Macy as Pitt
 Amy Sloan as Carla
 William Earl Brown as Puffy
 Heather Lind as Mincy
 Christie Burke as Ingrid
 Jenica Bergere as Colette
 Lana Giacose as Angela

Production
Filming began in February 2012 in Vancouver, British Columbia. The film was released on September 20, 2013, and distributed in the United States by Tribeca Film.

Reception
A Single Shot received mixed reviews from critics. The website's critical consensus states, "It has a bleak sense of atmosphere and a terrific performance by Sam Rockwell, but A Single Shot is undercut by its predictable story and slow pace." The film also has a score of 53 out of 100 on Metacritic, based on 16 critics, indicating "mixed or average reviews".

Soundtrack
The music for A Single Shot was written by Icelandic-born composer Atli Örvarsson whose music is strongly rooted in 20th century modernism. The score was recorded with the London Metropolitan Orchestra. The soundtrack has been released digitally and on CD by MovieScore Media / Kronos Records. One of the special things about the soundtrack is that the shorter cues have been organized into movements, thus creating a program that sounds very much like a concert piece.

References

External links 
 
 

2013 films
2013 crime thriller films
2013 psychological thriller films
2010s American films
2010s English-language films
American crime thriller films
Bron Studios films
Films based on American novels
Films based on thriller novels
Films directed by David M. Rosenthal
Films scored by Atli Örvarsson
Films shot in British Columbia